Octavio Becerril Morales (born 31 March 1964) is a Mexican former footballer who played as a defender.

Career statistics

International

Managerial statistics

References

1964 births
Living people
Mexico international footballers
Footballers from Mexico City
Association football defenders
Deportivo Toluca F.C. players
C.D. Veracruz footballers
Club Necaxa footballers
Mexican footballers